Denis Peposhi (born 1 February 1995)  is an Albanian professional footballer  who plays as a striker for KF Drenica in the  Football Superleague of Kosovo.

References

1995 births
Living people
Association football forwards
Albanian footballers
KF Liria players
FK Kukësi players
KF Drenica players
FC Kamza players
KF Korabi Peshkopi players
Kategoria Superiore players